Walter Pfrimer (22 December 1881 – 31 May 1968) was an Austrian politician and leader of the Heimwehr in Styria. He was the leader of a failed putsch in 1931.

Early years
The son of a wine merchant, Pfrimer studied law at the University of Graz, gaining his doctorate in 1906. As a student he had been a member of the Burschenschaft and an ardent follower of the German nationalist and antisemitic hard-liner Georg Ritter von Schönerer before settling into a position as a lawyer in Judenburg.

He became a Heimwehr leader early in the movement's life and initially won the financial backing of the Alpine Montangesellschaft, the largest heavy industry concern in Austria. His Heimwehr unit was amongst the best armed, having received weapons from both Bavarian Georg Escherich rightist paramilitary leader and the local Landeshauptmann Anton Rintelen.

Political views
Pfrimer advocated Pan-Germanist and Völkische ideals and used the swastika for his Heimwehr units. Like his sometime ally Richard Steidle in Tyrol he unashamedly endorsed fascism for the Heimwehr, unlike other units that were close to the more ideologically pragmatic Christian Social Party,<ref>Philip Morgan, Fascism in Europe'p. 63', 2003, p. 34</ref> and in 1930 publicly advocated the overthrow of the government and the establishment of a fascist regime in Austria. The two fell out however after Pfrimer, who argued that Jews must be treated as a foreign race, suggested that Steidle was too weak on the issue. Pfrimer took up with Ernst Rüdiger Starhemberg and helped to ensure that the nobleman replaced Steidle as Heimwehr leader in 1930. He was also a staunch opponent of socialism, often leading his men in violent attacks on the Social Democratic Party of Austria, whilst rejecting parliamentary democracy as un-German.

Putsch
As head of the Heimwehr in Styria he attempted a putsch in 1931, initially in his own region. After rising up in Styria his units launched a marcia su Wien'' in a direct copy of Benito Mussolini's March on Rome but it proved to be a disaster and Pfrimer became mockingly known as the "half-day dictator" in reference to how long it took to put his attempted rebellion down. He failed to gain support from the other regional leaders and indeed the coup was so poorly organised that it was easily put down by the otherwise weak government of Karl Buresch.

Aftermath
Pfrimer was damaged irreparably by the fiasco of putsch. The failure also represented a further blow to the credibility of the Heimwehr, which lost more members to the Nazi Party as a consequence. He fled to Yugoslavia before returning to face a treason trial but in a surprise move he was acquitted of all charges.

Finally in 1933 Pfrimer allied himself and his units to the Nazis and before long his group had been absorbed entirely and he became a strong advocate of Anschluss. His membership of the Nazi Party was made official on 24 February 1933. When the Anschluss for which he had longed was completed in 1938 he returned to some prominence and sat as a member of the Reichstag.

After the Allies liberated Austria Pfrimer was taken prisoner by the British forces and held in internment for a year. Following his release he returned to his legal practice in Judenburg and lived out his days as a private citizen.

References

1881 births
1968 deaths
Politicians from Maribor
Austrian politicians
Austrian Nazi lawyers
Coup d'état attempts in Europe
Members of the Reichstag of Nazi Germany
German nationalism in Austria
German nationalists
Military personnel from Maribor
World War II prisoners of war held by the United Kingdom